Angas was an electoral district of the House of Assembly in the Australian state of South Australia from 1938 to 1970 and which was associated with the town of Angaston.

Members

Election results

References 

Former electoral districts of South Australia
1938 establishments in Australia
1970 disestablishments in Australia
Constituencies established in 1938
Constituencies disestablished in 1970